James Orrock R.I., R.O.I. (1829 – 10 May 1913), was a prominent Scottish collector of art and oriental ceramics, illustrator and landscape watercolourist. The scale of his involvement with the art trade and with top collectors such as John Ruskin is highlighted in the large two volume set of books published about him by Byron Webber: published in London, Chatto and Windus 1903: James Orrock R.I., Painter, Connoisseur, Collector. Rather than being a forger as some modern scholars like to believe Orrock was a dedicated enthusiast of contemporary British art and emulated some of those artists in his own work. He illustrated three books in the style of Turner: Mary Queen-of-Scots, 1906; Old England : her story mirrored in her scenes, 1908; and, In the Border country, 1906.

Life

James was the son of James Orrock, an Edinburgh surgeon, dentist and druggist, living at 17 Elm Row at the top of Leith Walk. The family moved to 2 York Place when he was young.

He was educated in medicine, surgery, and dentistry at Edinburgh University, after which he practised as a dentist in Nottingham. Orrock studied painting under James Ferguson, William L. Leitch, and John Burgess, later enrolling at the Nottingham School of Design where he was taught by Thomas Stuart Smith.

He settled in London by 1866, becoming an associate of the Royal Institute of Painters in Water Colours in 1871, exhibiting at the Royal Scottish Academy and Royal Academy. His later style was highly influenced by David Cox, his paintings today are on show in various museums and galleries, including the Victoria and Albert Museum.

A strong advocate of J. M. W. Turner and British art in general (owning several of J.M.W Turner's most important works), he was also an impassioned collector of Adam-style furniture decorated by Angelica Kauffman. A landscape painter and watercolourist, he is now believed to have restored, altered and improved works by other painters within his collection. Orrock created art-period rooms in his house, which he opened to the general public.

Having on two previous occasions bought furniture and paintings from Orrock's personal collection, on Orrock's death Lord Leverhulme bought most of his art collection, and some one thousand of his own paintings. Part of that collection was used to create the Lady Lever Art Gallery at Port Sunlight.

Today, Orrock is also notable as having commissioned many of the copies associated with the works of John Constable. His association with one copy of A Sea Beach Brighton painting by Constable was featured on the BBC One's Fake or Fortune? in January 2014. 
Thomas Griffith, Turner's friend and agent/dealer was one of the executors of his estate. The artist gifted a very large early sea peace "Shipwreck, the Rescue" 161 x 222 cm. to Griffith (presumably the documented "Stormy Picture" they had discussed, in need of cleaning and restoring c1844). This sea piece was one of the earliest, if not the first of Turner's monumental sea piece series, c1801-02. He was only 26 at the time and this series made his fame early on. "Shipwreck, the Rescue' passed from Sir J.C. Robinson, surveyor of Queen Victoria's pictures, then to James Orrock Esq.

Family

His brother Hector Heatly Orrock (1831-1862) was a short-lived architect involved in railway station design with Sir Thomas Bouch.

References

External links

 
 
 

Artists from Edinburgh
Alumni of the University of Edinburgh
Scottish dentists
Scottish art collectors
Scottish orientalists
Scottish illustrators
Scottish watercolourists
Art forgers
1829 births
1913 deaths
19th-century Scottish painters
Scottish male painters
20th-century Scottish painters
19th-century dentists
19th-century Scottish male artists
20th-century Scottish male artists